Gan Raveh Regional Council (Mo'atza Ezorit Gan Raveh) is a regional council in the Central District of Israel. The council's area of jurisdiction extends to nine 
settlements: a kibbutz, six moshavim, a yeshuv kehilati and a youth village. In 2017, the total population was 6,026. The council serves  Ayanot, Beit Hanan, Beit Oved, Ge'alya, Gan Sorek, Irus, Kfar HaNagid, Neta'im, and Palmachim. 'Gan Raveh'  means well-watered garden and these are words in a biblical verse of Isaiah, which are reproduced on the signs of some of the council's villages, including Ayanot.

The head of the local council is Shlomo Elimelech.

References

External links
Official website  

 
Central District (Israel)
Regional councils in Israel